Ekerö IK is a Swedish club located in Ekerö.

Background
Ekerö IK currently plays in Division 4 which is the sixth tier of Swedish football. They play their home matches at the Träkvistavallen in Ekerö.

The club is affiliated to Stockholms Fotbollförbund.

Season to season

Footnotes

External links
 Ekerö IK – Official website
 Ekerö IK on Facebook

Football clubs in Stockholm
1921 establishments in Sweden